Baqar Lake Resort is a resort situated at the tail of Nara Canal near Chotiari Dam, Sanghar, Sindh, Pakistan. The resort is operated by the Sindh Tourism Development Corporation.

Establishment
The resort was established in 2017 by Culture, Tourism & Antiquities Department, Government of Sindh in development scheme 2016-17 fiscal year. After completion, the resort was handed over to Sindh Tourism Development Corporation in 2017.

Location
The resort is situated at the tail of Nara Canal, near to Chotiari Dam, Sanghar, Sindh.

Tourist attractions
Baqar lake also known as Chotiari Dam has various tourist attractions, including the historical Makhi forest, where Hurs had established their base against British Raj in Sindh also situated at the bank of Baqar lake. The Shrine of the Hur Movement's leader, Shah Mardan Shah, is situated beside the tail of Nara Canal.

References

External links
 STDC portal of Baqar Lake Resort

2017 establishments in Pakistan
Hotels established in 2017
Sindh Tourism Development Corporation Resorts